Come Through For You is the third full-length studio album by singer Javier Colon, and his first after winning NBC's reality talent show The Voice. As of June 2013, it has sold 46,000 copies.

Track list

Sales and chart performance
"Come Through For You" had sales of 9974 units its first week according to Soundscan. Despite being the winner of the first season of The Voice, Javier's album was outsold by Red, the album of the first season's runner-up, Dia Frampton.   As of June 2013, the album has sold 46,000 copies in the US.

Album

References

2011 albums
Javier Colon albums
Albums produced by Ryan Tedder
Albums produced by Pharrell Williams
Albums produced by the Messengers (producers)